The Rural People's Movement was a farmers' protest movement in northern Germany from 1928 to 1933. Due to an agricultural crisis, demonstrations took place in numerous towns and cities in early 1928, and deputations were sent to Berlin to  voice grievances against trade and tax policies. Farmers' continuing financial difficulties and dissatisfaction with their own lobby organizations led to more radical protests, especially in the province of Schleswig-Holstein, from late 1928. Passive resistance included tax strikes and the obstruction of foreclosures, but some farmers, with the assistance of nationalist radicals, resorted to terrorist methods. Throughout 1929 bombs were placed in public buildings, including the Reichstag. The Rural People's Movement ran its own newspaper "Das Landvolk" which was edited by Bruno von Salomon, the brother of Ernst von Salomon. With the arrest of the bombers and many of its leaders, as well as the rise of the Nazi Party, the Landvolk declined from 1930.

Hans Fallada's first successful novel, A Small Circus (Bauern, Bonzen und Bomben), was based on the farmers' protests, especially a demonstration and boycott of the town of  Neumünster.

References 
Rudolf Heberle, From Democracy to Nazism; a regional case study on political parties in Germany. Baton Rouge, 1945.
Alexander Otto-Morris, Rebellion in the Province. The Landvolkbewegung and the Rise of National Socialism in Schleswig-Holstein. Frankfurt am Main, 2013.
Gerhard Stoltenberg, Politische Strömungen im schleswig-holsteinischen Landvolk 1918 - 1933. Ein Beitrag zur politischen Meinungsbildung in der Weimarer Republik. Düsseldorf, 1962.
Timothy A. Tilton, Nazism, Neo-Nazism and the Peasantry. Bloomington, 1975.

1928 establishments in Germany
1933 disestablishments in Germany
Agricultural organisations based in Germany
Organizations based in the Weimar Republic
20th century in Schleswig-Holstein
Politics of the Weimar Republic
Rural culture in Europe